This is a list of rockets launched from the El Arenosillo rocket launch facility in south Spain.

S: success; SP: partial success; SF: system failure; VF: vehicle failure; EF: experiment failure

References

Rockets and missiles